Leonardo Scaletti (c. 1435 – before 1495) was an Italian painter of the Renaissance period active in Faenza.

He is first documented active in 1458. Scaletti was active both in painting canvases and ceramics. He has been variously described as a follower, or influenced by, of Piero della Francesca, Francesco Cozza, and/or Francesco Squarzione. He is known for an Enthroned Madonna.

References

15th-century births
15th-century deaths
People from Faenza
15th-century Italian painters
Italian male painters
Italian Renaissance painters